For a Good Time, Call... is a 2012 American comedy film directed by Jamie Travis. It stars Ari Graynor, Lauren Miller Rogen, Justin Long, Sugar Lyn Beard, Mimi Rogers, Nia Vardalos, Mark Webber, and James Wolk. The film premiered at the Sundance Film Festival in January, 2012 where it secured a worldwide distribution deal with Focus Features. It was released theatrically in the United States on August 31, 2012.

Plot
After Lauren is dumped by her boyfriend, she can't afford a place of her own. Her friend Jesse tells her of a beautiful apartment by Gramercy Park, not including the fact that his friend Katie lives there. The women had a bad experience together back in college. Despite their clear disdain for each other, they move in together for lack of better options.

One night, Lauren hears strange noises from Katie's room. Believing she is being attacked, she opens the door to see Katie is saying sexually explicit things on the phone. Katie explains she works as a phone sex operator, as her writing does not earn her enough money to live in New York. Lauren is disgusted, but makes some suggestions how to make more money.

Several weeks go by, and Lauren loses her publishing job when her boss retires. Encouraging Katie to get a land line, 1-900-mmmhmmm, Lauren becomes her business manager as they go into business for themselves, which is much more lucrative. In a few weeks they make $12,000, of which Lauren gets , which increases when she becomes a phone operator herself. In the process, they become close friends.

Throughout the film, Katie speaks with a repeat customer named Sean and the calls become less about phone sex and more about getting to know one another. They agree to meet, but accompanied by Lauren and Jesse who are concerned he may be a rapist. However, they discover they are very well suited and begin a relationship. This leaves Katie feeling distressed as it is revealed that she is a virgin and has been lying for many years to cover up her insecurities.

Lauren gets an interview at a prestigious publishing company which previously rejected her, and Katie convinces her to do the interview to blow them off. She tells them she has been running a phone sex line all summer, and they offer her the job as they feel she has business savvy. Concerned about long-term prospects, Lauren accepts the job which angers Katie to the point where she reveals their business to Lauren's conservative parents. Lauren moves out and they stop speaking.

Lauren's ex-boyfriend Charlie returns from Italy and declares that he made a mistake in breaking up with her. He reveals that he had a passionate love affair with a fiery Italian woman, but if he is to succeed in his business he needs someone boring, predictable and simple - the same reasons he dumped her. She stands up for herself and leaves Charlie for good. Meanwhile, Katie and Sean decide to have sex and in order to calm their nerves they talk on the phone while lying next to each other in bed. When they are finished Katie feels sad that she can't share this news with Lauren, whom she loves. Sean encourages her to call her, and they declare that they 'think' they love each other.

Lauren and Katie call each other at the same time, engaging in a phone conversation full of unintentional innuendo before they meet each other on the street and hug.

Cast
 Ari Graynor as Katie Steele
 Lauren Miller Rogen as Lauren Powell
 Justin Long as Jesse
 Sugar Lyn Beard as Krissy
 Mimi Rogers as Adele Powell
 Don McManus as Scott Powell
 Nia Vardalos as Rachel Rodman
 Mark Webber as Sean
 James Wolk as Charlie
 Seth Rogen as Captain Jerry
 Kevin Smith as Cabbie
 Martha MacIsaac as Inmate
 Ken Marino as Harold

Production
Lauren Miller Rogen and Katie Anne Naylon based the script on their real-life experiences as college roommates.

The role of Katie was written specifically for Ari Graynor. Miller used her performance in Nick and Norah's Infinite Playlist as the inspiration for writing the character, and wrote Graynor a letter asking her to be involved in the production. The letter made Graynor cry. "I got this letter where they talked about what fans they were of my work and how they felt like I was one of the only people out there who could be both sexy and vulnerable and funny all at the same time," she stated.

Filming took place over 16 days in Los Angeles and New York City with a budget of $1.3 million. Miller and Naylon secured financing for the film independently. Focus Features picked up the film at the 2012 Sundance Film Festival for $2 million. James Schamus, chief executive at Focus, cited the film's 'emotionally generous' appeal and word-of-mouth potential as primary reasons for the acquisition.

Reception
For a Good Time, Call... has received generally mixed reviews. It currently stands at a 55% "rotten" rating on Rotten Tomatoes. "Brisk, funny, and sweetly raunchy, For a Good Time, Call... adds to the recent string of R-rated female comedies while serving as an overdue coming out party for the charming Ari Graynor," the consensus reads. Entertainment Weekly claimed, "It's Ari Graynor's movie—she's like Kate Hudson possessed by the spirit of Bette Midler. And all the better off for it."

Home media
For a Good Time, Call... was released on DVD and Blu-ray on January 22, 2013. The DVD features an audio commentary by director Jamie Travis, writer Katie Anne Naylon, and stars/producers Miller and Graynor, five deleted scenes, and a "look inside" featurette.

Soundtrack
The soundtrack for the film was released by Lakeshore Records on 28 August 2012.

 "Back and Forth" – Operator Please
 "I Promise" – Generationals
 "Come Alive" – Hanni El Khatib
 "Stick Together" – Mack Winston & The Reflections
 "Side Saddle" – People Get Ready
 "Black Water" – The Dig
 "By Your Hand" – Los Campesinos!
 "He Knew" – Chalk & Numbers
 "Operator" – Mary Wells
 "Flowers Bloom" – High Highs
 "Come Come" – Hot as Sun
 "Black Water" – Timber Timbre

References

External links
 
 
 
 

2012 films
2010s English-language films
2012 comedy films
2012 independent films
2010s buddy comedy films
2010s female buddy films
American buddy comedy films
American female buddy films
American independent films
Films directed by Jamie Travis
Films scored by John Swihart
Films set in New York City
Films shot in Los Angeles
Films shot in New York City
Focus Features films
Films about telephony
2012 directorial debut films
2010s American films